Monsù Desiderio is the  name formerly given to an artist  believed to have painted architectural scenes in a distinctive style in Naples in the early seventeenth century. The term monsù, a corruption of the French monsieur, was  often used by Neapolitan historians to denote a painter of foreign origin.

In the mid-twentieth century, art historians identified the works previously attributed to "Desiderio" as being by at least three different painters: François de Nomé and Didier Barra, both originally from Metz, and a third artist, whose name is unknown. Nomé's works were described by Rudolf Wittkower as "bizarre and ghostlike paintings of architecture, often crumbling and fantastic".

References

French Baroque painters
Italian Baroque painters